Florencio Amarilla Lacasa (3 January 1935 – 25 August 2012) was a Paraguayan footballer, coach and later actor. He played as a striker.

Amarilla was born in Bogado, Paraguay. He started his career in with Club Nacional in Paraguay before being transferred to Europe to play for teams like Elche CF and Real Oviedo of Spain.

He was also part of the Paraguay national football team that qualified to the 1958 FIFA World Cup. In the qualifiers, Amarilla was Paraguay's top scorer with 3 goals and he was also the top scorer for Paraguay in the World Cup with 2 goals.

Later career
Amarilla stayed in the Province of Almería in Spain after his career and began appearing in films shot in the region, most often as an unlisted extra but sometimes credited with a minor role. His on-screen appearances include 100 Rifles, Patton, El Condor, Catlow and Conan the Barbarian.

He died, aged 77, in Vélez Rubio, Spain.

Partial filmography
100 Rifles (1969) - (uncredited)
Patton (1970) - Soldier (uncredited)

References

External links
 
 

1935 births
2012 deaths
People from Itapúa Department
Association football forwards
Paraguayan footballers
Club Nacional footballers
La Liga players
Elche CF players
Real Oviedo players
Paraguay international footballers
1958 FIFA World Cup players
Paraguayan emigrants to Spain
Paraguayan football managers
Paraguayan male film actors
20th-century Paraguayan male actors